Ted Kessinger (born January 15, 1941) is a former American football coach. He is among the college football coaches with the most wins and the highest winning percentage.

Kessinger was the head coach of the first American football team to play in Sweden, and he was elected to the College Football Hall of Fame in 2010.  His son is Kent Kessinger, the head coach at Ottawa University.

Coaching career

Assistant coaching
Before becoming a head coach, Kessinger worked as an assistant coach at Augustana College in Sioux Falls, South Dakota and the South Dakota Coyotes in Vermillion.

Bethany
Kessinger was the head football coach at Bethany College in Lindsborg, Kansas from 1976 to 2003, where he posted a record of 219–57–1. He guided Bethany to the NAIA playoffs ten times and achieved a top 25 ranking 20 times. His teams never posted a losing season during his entire coaching tenure.

In 2000, his team won the American Family Charity Bowl, defeating the Kansas Wesleyan Coyotes by a score of 20–3.

Kessinger was inducted into the NAIA Hall of Fame in 2003 as well as the Kansas Sports Hall of Fame in 2005.

Head coaching record

Football

See also
 List of college football coaches with 200 wins

References

External links
 

1941 births
Living people
American football centers
American football linebackers
Augustana (Illinois) Vikings football coaches
Augustana (South Dakota) Vikings football coaches
Augustana (South Dakota) Vikings football players
Bethany Swedes football coaches
South Dakota Coyotes football coaches
College wrestling coaches in the United States
College Football Hall of Fame inductees
People from Lindsborg, Kansas
Sportspeople from Sioux Falls, South Dakota
Players of American football from South Dakota